Luis David Liberato (born December 18, 1995) is a Dominican professional baseball outfielder for the San Diego Padres of Major League Baseball (MLB).

Career
Liberato signed with the Seattle Mariners as an international free agent in 2013. He played in the Mariners organization until 2021.

Liberato signed with the San Diego Padres before the 2022 season. He was called up to the majors for the first time on September 9, 2022. On September 27, Liberato was designated for assignment.

See also
 List of Major League Baseball players from the Dominican Republic

References

External links

1995 births
Living people
Major League Baseball players from the Dominican Republic
Major League Baseball outfielders
San Diego Padres players
Dominican Summer League Mariners players
Arizona League Mariners players
Everett AquaSox players
Clinton LumberKings players
Jackson Generals (Southern League) players
Leones del Escogido players
Modesto Nuts players
Arkansas Travelers players
Tacoma Rainiers players
El Paso Chihuahuas players